Ajith Kumar  is an Indian actor who works mainly in Tamil cinema. Apart from a small role in the 1990 Tamil film En Veedu En Kanavar, his professional career began three years later with his debut as a lead actor in Tamil cinema with Amaravathi (1993). Despite being a moderate success, the film helped him obtain more modelling assignments. He followed it up the same year with Prema Pusthakam, his only Telugu film till date. After Amaravathi release, Ajith opted against acting, and instead tried pursuing a career in auto racing. While training for an amateur race, he injured his back and underwent three major surgeries, leaving him bed-ridden for a year and a half. After recovering from the injury, he played supporting roles in Paasamalargal (1994) and Pavithra (1994).  After this, he co-starred with Vijay in Rajavin Parvaiyile (1995). That same year, he had his breakthrough with the romantic thriller Aasai. His performance earned him critical acclaim and established him as an up-and-coming actor in Tamil cinema. 

He was next seen as the main lead in Agathiyan's epistolary Kadhal Kottai (1996), a critical and commercial success. In 1997, he had five releases, all of which were commercial failures. Ajith's dual portrayal of twin brothers—where one is deaf-mute—in S. J. Suryah's Vaalee (1999) won him his first Filmfare Award for Best Tamil Actor. Impressed with his performance in that film, Rajiv Menon cast Ajith in the ensemble drama Kandukondain Kandukondain (2000) which was also commercial and critical success.  The following year, he collaborated with debutant director AR Murugadoss on the action film Dheena. The film was successful in establishing his reputation as an action hero and earning him the nickname "Thala" ("head"). He earned critical acclaim for his dual role performance in the vigilante film Citizen (2001), and the film was commercial success. and a Best Actor nomination at Filmfare for the drama Poovellam Un Vasam (2001). His last release of the year was Santosh Sivan's Hindi film Aśoka, where he played a brief antagonistic role opposite Shah Rukh Khan. His dual-role performance as twin brothers in K. S. Ravikumar's film Villain (2002) won him a second Filmfare Award for Best Tamil Actor.

Between 2003 and 2005, Ajith cut back on his acting career to focus on his racing career. During this time, he had his only commercial success with Attahasam (2004). Two years later he starred in Ravikumar's Varalaru, in which he played three different roles. It became the highest-grossing Tamil film of that year, and Ajith went on to receive his third Best Tamil Actor award at Filmfare for his performance. In 2007 he was seen in two remakesKireedam and Billa, both of which were big box office hits. His next two releases, Aegan (2008) and Aasal (2010), were critical and commercial failures.

Ajith played an antihero—as a money-minded, suspended police officer—in Venkat Prabhu's Mankatha (2011). It had the biggest opening of that year for a Tamil film, and became Ajith's biggest commercial success to that point. His next release, Billa II (2012), Tamil cinema's first prequel, opened to mixed reviews. He followed that with the multi-starrer Arrambam (2013) and Siva's masala film Veeram (2014), both of which were commercially successful. In 2015 he collaborated with Gautham Vasudev Menon for the crime thriller Yennai Arindhaal. His performance as an undercover police officer earned him a Best Tamil Actor nomination at the 63rd Filmfare Awards South. His second release of the year, Vedalam, had the biggest opening day in Tamil cinema and was among the highest grossing Tamil films of the year.

Film 

All films are in Tamil, unless otherwise noted.

See also 
List of awards and nominations received by Ajith Kumar

Notes

References

External links 
 

Male actor filmographies
Indian filmographies